Undercover  are an English dance music group which formed in 1991 and had three UK top-30 hits, two of them top-five hits, in 1992. The group's vocalist, John Matthews, continues to perform solo as Undercover across the UK/Europe and South America. Keyboardist Steve Mac went on to become a successful songwriter and music producer for many other artists.
Bassist Jon Jules went on to success in the UK soul music scene as a DJ, radio presenter and event organiser. He achieved many accolades, including best radio programme (Soul Survivors Awards), and is a seasoned presenter on DAB soul internet radio station Mi-Soul Radio.

Overview 
The group's first single, a cover version of Gerry Rafferty's 1978 UK/US chart success "Baker Street", became their biggest hit, reaching No. 2 in the UK Singles Chart in September 1992, held off from the top by another dance track, "Rhythm Is a Dancer" by Snap!. It was the 11th-biggest-selling single of 1992 in the United Kingdom, and also attained major chart success across Europe, selling over a quarter of a million units in Germany alone.

Undercover released five more chart singles. The group's second single, a cover of Andrew Gold's "Never Let Her Slip Away", also originally a 1978 track, reached No. 5 and stayed in the charts in the United Kingdom for 11 weeks. After the success of these two singles, an album, Check Out the Groove, was released, reaching No. 26 in the UK Albums Chart. "I Wanna Stay with You" (a cover of the Gallagher and Lyle song) and "Lovesick", both from 1993, managed No. 28 and No. 62 respectively. 

In 1994, Undercover released a new single, "Best Friend", and their second album, Ain't No Stopping Us. The musical style of Undercover's interpretations is cheerful and upbeat, incorporating electronic drums and short piano or organ harmonies with repetitive and layered vocal phrases, typical for club songs of the 1990s.

Discography

Studio albums

Singles

Members 

 John Matthews – vocals
 Jon Jules – bass guitar 
 Steve Mac – keyboards

References

Musical groups established in 1991
1991 establishments in the United Kingdom
English electronic music groups
English dance music groups
English house music groups
Musical groups from London